East Woods School (EWS) is a relatively small private school in Oyster Bay Cove, Long Island, New York. The school serves students from many local communities, including Oyster Bay, Oyster Bay Cove, East Norwich, Centerport, Cove Neck, Cold Spring Harbor, Locust Valley, Huntington, Glen Cove, Laurel Hollow, Brookville, Upper Brookville, Old Brookville, Syosset and Muttontown.

Headmaster
The current Head of School (since July 2017) is Laura Kang, the first female Head of School at East Woods.

School info
East Woods School is an independent, non-sectarian, coeducational day school for students in nursery through eighth grade.

The school is located on 31 Yellow Cote Road, Oyster Bay Cove, New York, 11771.

A group of concerned parents founded the school in 1946 to provide children with an education combining exemplary academics and character development. The school was originally a mansion, and it still resembles one today. The  campus includes a 20,000 volume library, two computer labs, two art studios, two gyms, two music rooms, a science lab, a headmaster's house, four playing fields and an outdoor swimming pool. The school has three divisions, two of which are all connected in the same building. The Early Childhood Center (ECC) includes Pre-nursery, Nursery, and Pre-K classrooms, and is in the same building as the lower school classrooms (grades K-4). The upper school (grades 5-8) has a separate academic building. The school year is packed with frequent assemblies that include visits by famous and important people and speakers, along with groups that perform shows for the students.

Average student to teacher ratios: 
 Pre-Nursery: 4 to 1
 Nursery - K: 8 to 1
 Grades 1-8:  12 to 1

Academics
Languages offered by the school include French and Spanish.

Admissions
The school charges a tuition ($4,800-$25,100) depending on grade, though financial aid of up to 60% of tuition is available. Most students are given an admission exam to determine level. East Woods School states that it does not discriminate against anyone by race, religion, or ethnicity.

Athletics
Interscholastic sports involve fourth through eighth grade students. The students' choices are between soccer, cross-country, basketball, baseball, softball and lacrosse.

Library
The Rousmaniere Library is the center of many academic, curricular and community-related activities for East Woods School. The facility contains approximately 20,000 volumes, including an extensive reference collection, which is supplemented with online databases. The library includes an area with networked computers and a SmartBoard to provide an interactive learning environment. The library hosts both the Early Childhood Program and space for students to conduct research for their independent study projects.

Discovery summer program
Discovery is a six-week summer program held on the East Woods School campus, offered to boys and girls between the ages of 3 and 12 years. The program is divided into four groups based on age and interests. Activities include sports and outdoor games, arts and crafts, jewelry-making, computer games, cooking, dance, theater, and chess. The Discovery summer program is well known in the area for its two huge slip-and-slides that run down a hill in the back of the school. Every child age five and up receives swimming instruction from certified lifeguards.

References

External links
School website

Educational institutions established in 1946
Private middle schools in New York (state)
Private elementary schools in New York (state)
1946 establishments in New York (state)